Government College of Technology (or GCT), Multan, Punjab, Pakistan was formerly known as Government Polytechnic Institute. The institute was established in 1965 and upgraded to Government College of Technology in 1981–1982. GCT is covered  area. It is located in Qasim Pur Colony, Bahawalpur road, Multan. Due to the road broadness, its main gate has been shifted to backside and the name of college written for years on it now has been disappeared.

This college offers three-year diploma of associate engineers courses in:
 Electrical technology
 Mechanical technology
 Civil technology
 Chemical technology
 Electronics technology
 Textile technology (dyeing and weaving)

References

 http://www.tevta.gop.pk/contact-districtoffice.php
 http://www.pakworkers.com/news/gct-multan-dae3-years-diploma-admission-2016
 http://www.tevta.gop.pk/Institutes.php

Educational institutions established in 1965
Universities and colleges in Multan
1965 establishments in Pakistan